LeBeau or Le Beau may refer to:

 LeBeau (surname)
 Lebeau, Louisiana, an unincorporated community
 LeBeau, South Dakota, a ghost town

See also
 LeBeau Plantation, Arabi, Louisiana 
 Saint-Martin-le-Beau, a commune in the Indre-et-Loire department in central France
Beau (disambiguation)